The 2011–12 Terceira Divisão season was the 62nd season of the competition and the 22nd season of recognised fourth-tier football in Portugal.

Overview
The league was contested by 93 teams in 8 divisions of 10 to 12 teams.

Terceira Divisão – Série A
Série A – Preliminary league table

Terceira Divisão - Série A Promotion Group

Terceira Divisão - Série A Relegation Group

Terceira Divisão – Série B
Série B – Preliminary league table

Terceira Divisão - Série B Promotion Group

Terceira Divisão - Série B Relegation Group

Terceira Divisão – Série C
Série C – Preliminary league table

Terceira Divisão - Série C Promotion Group

Terceira Divisão - Série C Relegation Group

Terceira Divisão – Série D
Série D – Preliminary league table

Terceira Divisão - Série D Promotion Group

Terceira Divisão - Série D Relegation Group

Terceira Divisão – Série E
Série E – Preliminary league table

Terceira Divisão - Série E Promotion Group

Terceira Divisão - Série E Relegation Group

Terceira Divisão – Série F
Série F – Preliminary league table

Terceira Divisão - Série F Promotion Group

Terceira Divisão - Série F Relegation Group

Terceira Divisão – Série Açores
Série Açores – Preliminary league table

Terceira Divisão - Série Açores Promotion Group

Terceira Divisão - Série Açores Relegation Group

Terceira Divisão – Série Madeira
Série Madeira – Preliminary league table

Terceira Divisão - Série Madeira Promotion Group

Terceira Divisão - Série Madeira Relegation Group

Footnotes

External links
 Portuguese Division Three - footballzz.co.uk

Portuguese Third Division seasons
Port
4